Oskar Nikolai Birger Svendsen (born 10 April 1994 in Lillehammer) is a former Norwegian cyclist.

Svendsen holds the record of VO2max (maximum amount of oxygen uptake) with 97.5 milliliter per kilogram per minute, set at the University in Lillehammer before the 2012 Junior World Time Trial Championships.

Major results
2012
 1st  Time trial, UCI Junior Road World Championships
 National Junior Road Championships
1st  Time trial
2nd Road race
 9th Course de la Paix Juniors
2013
 1st Stage 3 (TTT) Circuit des Ardennes
 5th Overall Tour de l'Avenir
2014
 4th Time trial, National Road Championships

References

External links

1994 births
Living people
Norwegian male cyclists